R. Dhanuskodi Athithan (born 6 March 1953) is an Indian politician who was a member of the 14th Lok Sabha of India. He represented the Tirunelveli constituency of Tamil Nadu and is a member of the Indian National Congress (INC) political party. He was critically wounded in a road accident which happened near Vaagaikulam on the Tirunelveli - Tuticorin National Highway on 6 August 2006. His wife Indra Devi Adithan died in the accident.

Electoral performance in Lok Sabha Elections

References

External links
 Members of Fourteenth Lok Sabha - Parliament of India website

1953 births
Living people
Indian Tamil people
Lok Sabha members from Tamil Nadu
India MPs 2004–2009
India MPs 1996–1997
India MPs 1991–1996
India MPs 1989–1991
India MPs 1984–1989
Indian National Congress politicians from Tamil Nadu
Union Ministers from Tamil Nadu
Tamil Maanila Congress politicians
People from Thoothukudi district
People from Tirunelveli district